Stanley Francis (14 April 1906 – 25 January 1994) was an Australian cricketer. He played eight first-class matches for Western Australia between 1933/34 and 1936/37.

See also
 List of Western Australia first-class cricketers

References

External links
 

1906 births
1994 deaths
Australian cricketers
Western Australia cricketers